Sir Francis Noel Curtis-Bennett, KCVO (14 May 1882 – 2 December 1950) was a British civil servant and sports administrator. In the Civil Service, he reached the rank of Assistant Secretary in HM Treasury, whilst in sports he was involved with numerous organizations, and was a member of the International Olympic Committee and of the International Playing Fields Committee.

He was the son of Sir Henry Curtis-Bennett, Chief Metropolitan Magistrate, and the younger brother of Sir Henry Honywood Curtis-Bennett, KC.

References

External links 

 

British sports executives and administrators
1950 deaths
Knights Commander of the Royal Victorian Order
20th-century British civil servants
Civil servants in HM Treasury
Civil servants in the Ministry of Health (United Kingdom)
International Olympic Committee members
Civil servants in the Ministry of Agriculture, Fisheries and Food